Cullen Troy Collopy (born ) is a South African rugby union player for the  in Super Rugby and the Currie Cup and the  in the Rugby Challenge. He can play as a hooker or flanker.

Rugby career

Schoolboy and youth rugby

Collopy was born in Cape Town, but grew up in KwaZulu-Natal, for whom he played several times at schoolboy level. He played for them at the Under-13 Craven Week in 2006, the Under-16 Grant Khomo Week in 2009 and the Under-18 Craven Week in 2011.

He was a member of the  squads in 2013 and 2014, making three appearances in the latter competition.

2016: Western Province

Collopy joined the Cape Town-based  in 2016 and was named in their squad for the 2016 Currie Cup qualification series. Western Province finished top of the log in the competition, winning thirteen of their fourteen matches.

2016: Eastern Province Kings

For the second half of 2016, Collopy joined the Port Elizabeth-based . He was named in their squad for the 2016 Currie Cup Premier Division and made his Currie Cup debut in their rescheduled midweek match against . He came on as a replacement after 54 minutes and scored his first Currie Cup try in the final minute of a 24–47 defeat.

2017–present: Barcelona

After the 2016 Currie Cup, Collopy joined Spanish División de Honor side FC Barcelona. He made his debut in their match against El Salvador, starting as a flanker and scoring a try just after the hour mark in a 19–44 defeat.

References

South African rugby union players
Living people
1993 births
South African people of Irish descent
Rugby union players from Cape Town
Rugby union hookers
Rugby union flankers
Eastern Province Elephants players
Western Province (rugby union) players
Alumni of Kearsney College